The 1999–2000 Moldovan Cup was the ninth season of the Moldovan annual football cup competition. The competition ended with the final held on 24 May 2000.

Round of 16
The first legs were played on 20 October 1999. The second legs were played on 3 November 1999.

|}

Quarter-finals
The first legs were played on 15 March 2000. The second legs were played on 5 April 2000.

|}

Semi-finals
The first legs were played on 19 April 2000. The second legs were played on 3 May 2000.

|}

Final

References
 

Moldovan Cup seasons
Moldovan Cup
Moldova